Rebecca Jane Morse  (born 26 August 1977, in South Australia) is an Australian journalist, news and radio presenter.

Morse was a presenter of Adelaide's 10 News First. She is also a co-host on SAFM's breakfast radio show Bec, Cosi & Lehmo in Adelaide with Andrew "Cosi" Costello and Anthony Lehmann.

Career 
Morse attended Blackwood High School and the University of South Australia at Magill.  Prior to joining Ten she worked for the ABC in Adelaide as a reporter and presenter. She was a finalist in the Walkley Awards in 2004 in the category of Television News Reporting and in 2005 won the gold award for Journalist of the Year at the South Australian Media Awards.

Morse replaced Kelly Nestor in March 2006.

In 2012, Morse hosted "The Newsfeed" with Ryan "Burgo" Burgess on SAFM.

In August 2020, Morse was made redundant by Network 10. She presented her final Adelaide-based 10 News First bulletin on 11 September before production of the state-based Adelaide bulletin moved back to Melbourne.

Personal life 
She is married to Nine News reporter James (Jimmy) Wakelin; they have three daughters, Grace, Milla and Frankie.

References

University of South Australia alumni
1977 births
10 News First presenters
ABC News (Australia) presenters
Living people
Journalists from South Australia
People from Adelaide
Australian women television journalists